Thomas Albert Clements (born June 18, 1953) is an American football coach and a former Canadian Football League (CFL) quarterback who is the quarterbacks coach for the Green Bay Packers of the National Football League (NFL). He also served as an assistant coach for the Arizona Cardinals, Buffalo Bills, Pittsburgh Steelers, Kansas City Chiefs, New Orleans Saints and the University of Notre Dame.

Playing career

High school
Clements attended Canevin Catholic High School in Pittsburgh, Pennsylvania.  Clements was a four-year letterman in both football and basketball.  He was also offered a basketball scholarship at North Carolina, but decided to play football instead.  He is the only athlete in Canevin history to have his jersey retired.

College
Clements was the starting quarterback for the Notre Dame football team from 1972 to 1974 and led the team to a national championship in 1973. In the December 31, 1973, Sugar Bowl matchup against Alabama, Clements had a 36-yard square-out completion to tight end Robin Weber on 3rd and 9 from his own end zone with 2:00 left to secure a 24-23 victory.  In 1974, Clements finished fourth in the voting for the Heisman Trophy and was voted a first-team All-American.

Professional
After graduation, Clements began a career in the Canadian Football League, quarterbacking the Ottawa Rough Riders for four seasons and winning the league's Rookie-of-the-Year award in his inaugural campaign. The next season, he helped to lead the team to what became the Rough Riders' last Grey Cup victory. After taking a powerful hit, a woozy Clements threw a pass to tight end Tony Gabriel in the end zone, a catch which became famous in defeating the Saskatchewan Roughriders.

During his time with Ottawa, Clements shared the passing duties with Condredge Holloway, from 1975 to 1977 as the quarterback getting the most playing time. In 1978, their stats were comparable, except for Holloway throwing only two interceptions to 12 by Clements.

Clements continued his career with the Saskatchewan Roughriders in 1979, but did not fare well, throwing only two touchdowns to 11 interceptions and being replaced by Danny Sanders. However, a trade to the Hamilton Tiger-Cats quickly rejuvenated Clements, and he led the CFL in passing yards with 2,803, the last to do so with less than 3,000 yards. In 1980, Clements was briefly on the roster of the NFL's Kansas City Chiefs, coached by former Montreal Alouettes head coach Marv Levy, but was the third-string quarterback for a team that stressed the running game. In 1981, Clements returned to the Tiger-Cats and threw for 4,536 yards. He improved his numbers the next season with 4,706 yards. In 1983, Clements was traded from Hamilton to the Winnipeg Blue Bombers for long-time Blue Bomber quarterback Dieter Brock. The next year, those two teams, Hamilton and Winnipeg, faced each other in the Grey Cup. Clements led the Bombers to their first Grey Cup victory since 1962. In 1986, he set a new completion percentage record with 67.5, 173 out of 256. Clements finished his playing career with Winnipeg in 1987 and was also named the league's Most Outstanding Player.  He finished his CFL career with over 39,000 passing yards, 252 passing touchdowns, and a 60.35 completion percentage. In 2005, for the 75th anniversary of the Winnipeg Blue Bombers, Clements was selected one of the Bombers 20 all-time great players.  In addition, in November 2006, he was voted one of the CFL's Top 50 players (#47) of the league's modern era by Canadian sports network TSN.

Clements was inducted into the Canadian Football Hall of Fame in 1994.

Coaching career
In 1992, Clements was hired as quarterbacks coach for Notre Dame, where he served until 1995 under head coach Lou Holtz.  After practicing law in 1996, Clements took his first NFL job, working as the quarterback coach for the New Orleans Saints from 1997 to 1999.  Clements would hold the same job in 2000 with the Kansas City Chiefs, and between 2001 and 2003 with the Pittsburgh Steelers; under Clements's tutelage, the Chiefs' Elvis Grbac (in 2000) and the Steelers' Kordell Stewart (in 2001) and Tommy Maddox (in 2002) each reached the Pro Bowl.

Buffalo Bills
In 2004 and 2005 Clements served as offensive coordinator for the Buffalo Bills, but was released by the team after a front-office shakeup in which Marv Levy, his coach with the Chiefs in 1980, assumed the position of general manager and ultimately installed Dick Jauron as the team's new head coach.

Green Bay Packers
Upon the hiring of Mike McCarthy to be the head coach of the Green Bay Packers on January 11, 2006, the Packers parted ways with several assistant coaches, and McCarthy later interviewed NFL Europe head coach Steve Logan and Clements, settling on Clements on January 28, 2006.
During Clements time as the quarterbacks coach with the Packers, he has worked with starting quarterbacks: Brett Favre, Aaron Rodgers, and Matt Flynn. In 2007, Favre statistically had one of his best seasons with the Packers, taking them to the NFC Championship game. Clements is also credited for assisting in the development of one of the game's elite quarterbacks in Aaron Rodgers, as the only player in NFL history to throw for 4,000+ yards during his first two years as a starting quarterback in 2008 and 2009, and winning Super Bowl XLV and Super Bowl Most Valuable Player Award in Rodgers' third year as a starting quarterback in 2010.  In Week 17 of the 2011 season, after the Packers went 14-1, McCarthy chose to deactivate Rodgers to keep him healthy for the playoffs and start backup quarterback, Matt Flynn, on January 1, 2012 at Lambeau Field vs. the Detroit Lions, Flynn's second start in his career.  Throughout the game, Clements worked with Flynn on the sidelines, showing him what to look for in the photos from the previous offensive series. Flynn had a record-setting performance, throwing for 480 yards and 6 touchdowns, both single game records for the Packers. On February 12, 2015, Clements role was elevated to assistant head coach with respective play-calling responsibilities.  On January 26, 2017, McCarthy announced Clements' contract had expired and he would move on to pursue other opportunities.

Arizona Cardinals
On January 22, 2019, Clements was hired as passing game coordinator/quarterbacks coach for the Arizona Cardinals on the staff of new head coach Kliff Kingsbury after being out of the NFL the past two years. Clements was hired as the primary offensive assistant because no offensive coordinator on the staff was added, with Kingsbury calling plays and doing other coordinator-type duties.

In January 2021, Clements announced his retirement from coaching.

Green Bay Packers (second stint)
On February 17, 2022, Clements came out of retirement and joined the Green Bay Packers as the quarterbacks coach again, this time under head coach Matt LaFleur.

Personal life
While still in the CFL, Clements received his Juris Doctor degree magna cum laude from Notre Dame Law School in 1986. Upon the completion of his playing career, he practiced law in Chicago for five years at the law firm Bell, Boyd & Lloyd (now K&L Gates).

References

External links

 Green Bay Packers bio
 Just Sports Stats

1953 births
Living people
American football quarterbacks
American players of Canadian football
Arizona Cardinals coaches
Buffalo Bills coaches
Canadian Football Hall of Fame inductees
Canadian Football League Most Outstanding Player Award winners
Canadian Football League Rookie of the Year Award winners
Canadian football quarterbacks
Green Bay Packers coaches
Hamilton Tiger-Cats players
Kansas City Chiefs coaches
Kansas City Chiefs players
National Football League offensive coordinators
New Orleans Saints coaches
Notre Dame Fighting Irish football players
Notre Dame Law School alumni
Ottawa Rough Riders players
People from McKees Rocks, Pennsylvania
Pittsburgh Steelers coaches
Players of American football from Pennsylvania
Saskatchewan Roughriders players
Sportspeople from Pennsylvania
Winnipeg Blue Bombers players